Leighton Hall may refer to:

Leighton Hall, Lancashire
Leighton Hall, Powys

Architectural disambiguation pages